Mukherjee Nagar, is a neighbourhood in northern Delhi.
It was named in honor of Dr. Shyama Prasad Mukherjee

Coaching Industry

Mukherjee Nagar is home to many coaching institutes. It is one of the two education hubs in Delhi for government job aspirants (the other being Rajendra Nagar).

The streets are filled with sprawling book stores, libraries, rental housing and eateries an ancillary business along with the coaching industry.

Coaching industry was severely impacted in 2020 because of the COVID-19 Pandemic.

Protests
Filled with a huge number of aspirants and students, Mukherjee Nagar has been the epicenter of many student agendas and protests, especially against UPSC (2013) and against SSC (2017) both of which spread quickly nationwide, and led to involvement of Government of India either in form of Judicial activism in the former, or involving inspection by CBI in the latter.

Connectivity
Mukherjee Nagar is not directly on any metro line. It is connected to Guru Tegh Bahadur Nagar(GTB nagar) on the south, GT Karnal Road on the north, Nirankari colony on the west and Yamuna River on the east by road. There is no railway station or railway line passing through it. The nearest metro station to Mukherjee Nagar is Guru Tegh Bahadur Nagar.

Decline
For the past 2 years, Mukherjee Nagar has been experiencing a decrease in the influx of students. Big Players of the region, including 'Paramount Coaching' and 'KD Campus' are experiencing a decline in business. Many of the institutes and "star faculties" have switched to either freelancing, or online mode of teaching. The main reasons behind this trend in recent years are the land ceilings by Delhi Government, 2016 Indian banknote demonetization and prolonged court cases regarding CGL exams since 2013. The other subsidiary businesses associated and dependent on coaching industries have also felt the impact and have led to an increase in unemployment in teachers and staff alike. These subsidiary businesses include paying guest, brokerage and book shops.

On the contrary, there is one branch of the business that bloomed. This includes online test-series, YouTube channels, live-classes and other learning management systems. This encourages cheaper/free education and resource material for students. However, unlike classroom courses, as the accountability is virtually missing in these new emerging modes of knowledge transmission, it also leaves the students prone to inaccurate information and/or non-directional preparation.

Coaching Industry of Mukherjee Nagar and other parts of Delhi were severely impacted in 2020 because of the COVID-19 Pandemic.

References

Neighbourhoods in Delhi